The House of Boris and Tomo Bundalevski is a historical house in Galičnik that is listed as Cultural heritage of North Macedonia. It is in ownership of the family of Bundalevski.

History of the family
The family of Bundalevci stems from the family of Ognenovci. From Ognenovci, they share roots with the families of Karadakovci, Luzevci, Marevci, Ževairovci, Želčevci, Venovci, Šotarovci, Bislimovci and Tripunovci.

Notable members of the family
 Bundale ― progenitor of the family.
 Gjino Bundaleski ― son of Bundale. When he was 80 years old, he survived a plague and his close family died. Then he married a young woman from the village of Gari. She already had a 13-year-old son by the name Jovan. 
Jovan Bundaleski - adopted son of Gjino. 
 Boris Bundaleski - local activist in the mid 20th century.
 Pavle Bundaleski - local activist in the mid 20th century.
 Sofre Bundaleski - member of the Communist Party of Yugoslavia
 Rafe Bundaleski - member of the Communist Party of Yugoslavia

References

External links
 National Register of objects that are cultural heritage (List updated to December 31, 2012) (In Macedonian)
 Office for Protection of Cultural Heritage (In Macedonian)

Galičnik
Cultural heritage of North Macedonia
Historic houses